Natun Bazar is a local market in Dhanbari Upazila. It is a central point of Jadunathpur Union and it's considered a historical point.

References

Bazaars
Tangail District